Thomas Smith Williamson (March 1800 – June 24, 1879) was an American physician and missionary.

Williamson, the only son of Rev. William and Mary (Smith) Williamson, was born at Fair Forest, Union District, S. C., in March, 1800; in 1805 his father, wishing to set at liberty the slaves which he had inherited, moved to Manchester, Ohio.

He graduated from Jefferson College, Canonsburg, Pa , in 1820, and soon after began to read medicine with his brother-in-law, Dr. William Wilson, of West Union, Ohio. He also attended a course of medical lectures in Cincinnati, before attending the Yale Medical School, where he graduated in 1824.  On receiving his degree he settled in Ripley, Ohio, where he soon gained a good practice, and was married, April 10, 1827, to Margaret, daughter of Col. James Poage

A half-formed purpose to devote themselves to missionary work was rendered stronger by the early deaths of their first three children; and after spending one winter at Lane Theological Seminary, Cincinnati, and being licensed to preach the gospel, Dr. Williamson was appointed by the American Board in the spring of 1834 to visit the Indian tribes west of and near the Mississippi River and north of the State of Missouri. The result was the establishment by the Board of a new mission, of which Dr. Williamson was put in charge.  As soon as navigation opened in the spring of 1835, he left Ohio with his family, and until 1846 was stationed at Lac-qui-parle, among the Dakotas, in the western part of what is now the State of Minnesota. In 1846 he removed to Kaposia, five miles below St. Paul, and after the cession of these lands to the government, followed the Dakotas in 1852 to their reservation, and selected as his residence a spot some thirty miles south of Lac-qui-parle. He continued there until the Indian outbreak in 1862, and afterwards made his home at St. Peter, Minn., where he died, June 24, 1879, in his 80th year. His wife died in July, 1872.

From the time of his entrance on the missionary work, he gave himself unreservedly to the elevation and Christianization of the Dakotas; he lived to see among them ten native ordained ministers and about 800 church members, connected with the churches which he had planted. The crowning work of his life, the translation of the Bible into the language of the Sioux nation, was only completed, in connection with Rev. Dr. Riggs, about three months before his death.  His three surviving sons were all college graduates, and one of them was associated with his father in the missionary work.

External links
 
 Williamson papers at the Minnesota Historical Society

1800 births
1879 deaths
Physicians from Ohio
People from Spartanburg County, South Carolina
American Protestant missionaries
Washington & Jefferson College alumni
Yale School of Medicine alumni
Lane Theological Seminary alumni
19th-century American translators
Protestant missionaries in the United States
People from St. Peter, Minnesota
People from Manchester, Ohio
People from Ripley, Ohio
Missionary linguists